Robert Bradley Kendrick (born November 15, 1979) is an American retired professional tennis player. He turned professional in 2000. His career-high singles ranking is World No. 69, achieved in July 2009.

Early life

Robert Kendrick was born to Tom and Doris Kendrick and began playing tennis at the age of 5. Tom is a real estate appraiser and Doris is a housewife. Kendrick has three older siblings: Kerry, Tommy, and Scott. He graduated from Bullard High School in 1997. In 1996, he led his team to an undefeated section championship.

College and junior tennis career
Kendrick has been called a serve-and-volley player. Kendrick's main strengths are his serve and his forehand.

Throughout high school, he competed in junior tennis and enjoyed some intermittent success. In 1996, he was the runner-up in singles at the 1996 USTA Boys’ 18s National Indoor Championships. Then in 1997, he reached the final in doubles of the Easter Bowl and reached the singles final and took the doubles title at the USTA International Grass Court Championships. In 1998, he attended the University of Washington, earning All-American in singles and doubles as a sophomore, with a record of 31–9 and got as high as no. 3 in the collegiate rankings that year. He then transferred to Pepperdine University for his junior year and again attained All-American with an 18–10 record. He reached the round of 16 at the NCAA Men's Tennis Championship, where he lost to Jeff Morrison.  In 2001, he and Michael Russell won the  doubles championship at the USTA Futures event in Mobile, Alabama.

2006
In 2006, Kendrick entered the top 100 for the first time in his career, ending the year at world no. 87. Consequently, 2006 is generally considered to be Kendrick's breakthrough year to date.

Kendrick got to the second round of the 2006 ATP Delray Beach International Tennis Championships. He defeated Kevin Kim 6–4, 7–5 in the first round, but lost to eighth seed Vincent Spadea 4–6, 1–6, in his second-round match.

Kendrick went into Wimbledon ranked world no. 237. In his first match, he beat Yen-Hsun Lu 7–6, 6–3, 6–0. In the second round, he lost to second seed, Rafael Nadal. The Spaniard had to come back for only the second time in his career from two sets down to beat Kendrick 6–7, 3–6, 7–6, 7–5, 6–4. Kendrick's performance surprised many. Up until the final, Kendrick was the only player in the tournament to take sets from Nadal. The Spaniard lost the final to top-seeded Swiss Roger Federer.

Kendrick played in the Campbell's Hall of Fame Tenis Championships in Newport, Rhode Island. He made it to the quarterfinals, but was beaten by Andy Murray 0–6, 0–6.

He made amends for the defeat by winning the doubles title with his Austrian playing partner Jürgen Melzer. In the final, the duo beat South African Jeff Coetzee and American Justin Gimelstob.

2007
In 2007, Kendrick played in all four Grand Slam tournaments.  In January at the Australian Open, he drew Rafael Nadal in the first round and lost 6–7, 3–6, 2–6, committing six double faults and having a low percentage of second-serve points won (38%).  Kendrick subsequently lost in the first round of several tournaments before reaching the third round at the Sony Ericsson Open in Key Biscayne, Florida, where he was defeated in straight sets by Andy Murray. At the French Open, Kendrick again fell in the first round, losing in four sets to world no. 134 Juan Pablo Brzezicki of Argentina, again thanks to six double faults and a low percentage of second serve points won (this time, 46%).

At the Queen's Club Championships in June, he reached the second round and won a set against Novak Djokovic. At Wimbledon, however, he was not able to reach the second round as he had the previous year, losing a five-setter to Tommy Robredo. He went 1–3 in the US Open Series, before falling to Igor Andreev of Russia in the first round of the US Open itself 6–7, 3–6, 4–6.  Again, his second serve was a weakness: he won just 42% of second-serve points and double-faulted five times.

While 2007 was largely a lackluster year for Kendrick on the main ATP circuit, he did win three Challenger events: Dallas, Calabasas, and Knoxville. In Calabasas, Kendrick had to defeat two up-and-coming fellow Americans, John Isner and Donald Young, in the semifinals and finals, respectively.

2008
Kendrick kicked off 2008 by playing in the Australian Open, where he lost in the first round to fellow American Amer Delic, then ranked no. 136 4–6, 5–7, 2–6. Although Kendrick won 76% of points where he got his first serve in, he only won 36% of points where he did not. He was broken five times. Later in that year, he joined up with the apparel company Athletic DNA.

2009
Kendrick began the year with a loss in the first round of the 2009 Australian Open to Robin Söderling 7–5, 4–6, 4–6, 5–7. He made it to the second round of the Delray Beach International Tennis Championships, before losing to Evgeny Korolev 6–3, 6–6, 5–7, then losing to David Nalbandian in the second round of the BNP Paribas Open 4–6, 4–6. He beat Söderling in the second round of the Sony Ericsson Open, then lost in the third round to Jo-Wilfried Tsonga 5–7, 4–6.

Kendrick did not make it out of the first rounds of the U.S. Men's Clay Court Championships or the Estoril Open. At the 2009 French Open, he beat Daniel Brands 6–7, 7–5, 7–6, 4–6, 6–3, to advance to the second round for the first time in his career, where he lost 5–7, 0–6, 1–6, to Gilles Simon, who had also defeated him at the Estoril Open.

In the first round at Wimbledon, he was beaten by Andy Murray 5–7, 7–6, 3–6, 4–6.

2011

During the 2011 French Open, Kendrick tested positive for the drug methylhexanamine, which has been banned in sport since 2010. According to Kendrick, he unwittingly ingested the drug when taking a pill to combat jet lag.

The ITF ruled in July 2011 that he would be banned from the sport for 12 months, effective from May 22, 2011. The ITF also ruled that Kendrick's first-round finish at the 2011 French Open be disqualified, and his ranking points and prize money be taken away.

Kendrick received vocal public support from a number of prominent players, including James Blake, John Isner, and Andy Murray. In interviews, Blake and Isner specifically contrasted his case with that of Wayne Odesnik, who had just returned to active play after his own suspension for possession of human growth hormone.

Kendrick's ban was subsequently decreased to 8 months by the Court of Arbitration for Sport.

ATP career finals

Doubles: 2 (1 title, 1 runner-up)

ATP Challenger and ITF Futures finals

Singles: 26 (12–14)

Doubles: 30 (12–18)

Performance timelines

Singles

Doubles

References

External links

 
 
 Kendrick World Ranking History
 Circuit Player of the Week: Robert Kendrick

1979 births
Living people
American male tennis players
Sportspeople from Fresno, California
Sportspeople from Orlando, Florida
Pepperdine Waves men's tennis players
Tennis people from California
Tennis people from Florida
Washington Huskies men's tennis players
American sportspeople in doping cases
Doping cases in tennis